This article lists the squads of all participating teams in the 2021–22 FIH Pro League. The nine national teams involved in the tournament were required to register a squad of up to 32 players.

Argentina
The following is the Argentina squad for the 2021–22 FIH Pro League.

Head coach: Fernando Ferrara

Belgium
The following is the Belgium squad for the 2021–22 FIH Pro League.

Head coach:  Raoul Ehren

China
The following is the China squad for the 2021–22 FIH Pro League.

Head coach: Wang Yang

England
The following is the England squad for the 2021–22 FIH Pro League.

Head coach: David Ralph

Germany
The following is the Germany squad for the 2021–22 FIH Pro League.

Head coach:  Xavier Reckinger

India
The following is the India squad for the 2021–22 FIH Pro League.

Head coach:  Janneke Schopman

Netherlands
The following is the Netherlands squad for the 2021–22 FIH Pro League.

Head coach:  Alyson Annan

Spain
The following is the Spain squad for the 2021–22 FIH Pro League.

Head coach:  Adrian Lock

United States
The following is the United States squad for the 2021–22 FIH Pro League.

Head coach:  Anthony Farry

References

Women's FIH Pro League squads